Owain Taylor (born 18 January 1996 in Colchester) is a Welsh professional squash player. As of January 2023, he was ranked number 112 in the world. He represents Wales.

References

1996 births
Living people
Welsh male squash players